Ralph Keene (1902–1963) was an Indian-born British screenwriter, producer and film director. He is generally known for his work on documentaries. Following the Second World War he shot a number of non-fiction films outside Britain including in Cyprus, Ceylon and Persia.

Selected filmography

Screenwriter
 A Boy, a Girl and a Bike (1949)
 Double Confession (1950)

References

Bibliography
 Barsam, Richard Meran. Nonfiction Film: A Critical History.

External links

1902 births
1963 deaths
Businesspeople from Mysore
British film directors
British film producers
British male screenwriters
20th-century British screenwriters
British people in colonial India